Phtheochroa gracillimana is a species of moth of the family Tortricidae. It is found in Spain.

The wingspan is 6–9 mm. Adults have been recorded on wing in June.

References

Moths described in 1910
Phtheochroa